The Good Son (formerly known as Kung Kailangan Mo Ako / ), was a Philippine family drama television series starring Jerome Ponce, Joshua Garcia, Mccoy de Leon and Nash Aguas. The series premiered on ABS-CBN's Primetime Bida evening block and worldwide on The Filipino Channel on September 25, 2017 to April 13, 2018, replacing A Love to Last.

The mystery, family drama revolves around Victor Buenavidez (Albert Martinez), a good father in the eyes of his sons, Enzo (Jerome Ponce) and Calvin (Nash Aguas). Behind their father's image lies a dark secret: he has another son, Joseph (Joshua Garcia). Joseph and his half brother Obet (McCoy de Leon) grew up fatherless, each from a different father. Victor returns to Joseph's life and things are starting to get better for their family, but Victor dies suddenly. The two families clash with each other to clear their names for the latter's demise. How will Victor's three sons face the challenges presented by his sudden death?

Episodes

2017

September

October

November

December

2018

January

February

March

April

References

Lists of Philippine drama television series episodes